Preuilly is a commune in the Cher department in the Centre-Val de Loire region of France.

Geography

Population

Sights
 The church of St. Jean, dating from the twelfth century.
 A double feudal motte.

See also
Communes of the Cher department

References

Communes of Cher (department)